Monfortinho Airport  is an airstrip near the Portugal-Spain border serving Monfortinho, in the Castelo Branco municipality of Portugal.

See also
Transport in Portugal
List of airports in Portugal

References

External links
 OurAirports - Monfortinho
 Google Earth

Airports in Portugal